The Anthem of the Kirghiz SSR was the national anthem of the Kirghiz Soviet Socialist Republic (modern Kyrgyzstan). The music was composed by Vladimir Vlasov, Abdylas Maldybaev and Vladimir Fere, and the lyrics were written by Kubanychbek Malikov, Tulgebay Sydykbekov, Mukanbet Toktobaev, and Aaly Tokombaev.

Lyrics

1946-1956 Version

1956-1991 Version

Notes

References

External links
 Instrumental recording in MP3 format (Full version)
 Instrumental recording in MP3 format (Short version)
 Vocal recording in MP3 format
 MIDI file
 Lyrics - nationalanthems.info
 (1946-1956 version)

Kirghiz SSR
Kyrgyzstani music
National symbols of Kyrgyzstan
Kirghiz Soviet Socialist Republic
Kyrgyz anthems